Ponte Giuseppe Mazzini, also known as Ponte Mazzini, is a bridge that links Lungotevere dei Sangallo to Lungotevere della Farnesina in Rome (Italy), in the Rioni Regola and Trastevere.

Description 
The bridge was designed by engineers Viani and Moretti and built between 1904 and 1908; it was dedicated to Giuseppe Mazzini, one of the makers of Italian unification. 
The bridge links Via della Lungara to via Giulia; it was formerly called Ponte Gianicolense, in remembrance of the ancient bridge with the same name.

Notes

Bibliography 

Bridges completed in 1908
Mazzini
Stone bridges in Italy
Rome R. XIII Trastevere
1908 establishments in Italy